Back at the Chicken Shack is an album by Jimmy Smith. It was recorded in 1960 and released in 1963 on the Blue Note label. Smith recorded the album in the same session as his previous album Midnight Special. Fittingly, he wears the same red shirt on both album covers. It was cited in the book 1001 Albums You Must Hear Before You Die.

Track listing

Personnel
 Jimmy Smith – organ
 Stanley Turrentine – tenor saxophone
 Kenny Burrell – guitar (1,4)
 Donald Bailey – drums

Production
 Alfred Lion – producer
 Rudy Van Gelder – engineer
 Reid Miles – design
 Francis Wolff – photography
 Ira Gitler – liner notes

References

Jimmy Smith (musician) albums
1960 albums
Blue Note Records albums